2011–12 Raiffeisen Superliga was the thirteenth season of top-tier football in Kosovo.

Stadiums and locations

League table

Results

Matches 1–22

Matches 23–33

External links 
 Tabelle auf ffk-kosova.com

Football Superleague of Kosovo seasons
Kosovo
1